Achilleion (ancient Greek: Ἀχίλλειον) may refer to:
 Achilleion, Colombo, a 50-storey twin-tower apartment in Sri Lanka
 Achilleion (Corfu), a palace on the island of Corfu, Greece
 Achilleion (Thessaly), a neolithic site in Thessaly, Greece
 Achilleion (Troad), a Greek polis in the Troad, Turkey